The 6th constituency of the Haut-Rhin is a French legislative constituency in the Haut-Rhin département.

Description

The constituency is largely composed of the north of Mulhouse and its suburbs of Illzach and Wittenheim, however it also includes the canton of Sierentz to the south east.

In 2012 the constituency was unique among the constituencies of Haut-Rhin by being represented by someone other than the UMP, however the victorious party New Centre was closely allied to them.

Historic Representation

Election results

2022

 
 
|-
| colspan="8" bgcolor="#E9E9E9"|
|-

2017

 
 
 
 
 
 
 
|-
| colspan="8" bgcolor="#E9E9E9"|
|-
 
 

 
 
 
 
 Source: Ministry of the Interior

2012
 
 
 
 
 
 
|-
| colspan="8" bgcolor="#E9E9E9"|
|-

2007

Sources

6